Mark Adams (born 11 December 1961, in London) is an English car designer. He is current senior car designer at Opel Automobile and has worked as for brands including Cadillac, Buick and Opel.

Career
Adams studied both engineering and design and has masters in automotive design from the Royal College of Art in London.

Adams started his career with Ford.

Adams joined GM's former German brand Opel in 2002 as the newly created Director of Exterior Design role, responsible for exterior design of all Opel vehicles. He was appointed Vice President GM Europe Design in June 2007 where he created the consolidated GM Europe Design Center in Rüsselsheim, Germany and was responsible for designing cars across GM’s Opel, Saab and Saturn marques.

In August 2012 he became Executive Director of Design for Cadillac and Buick in the US.

In August 2013 Adams returned to Europe to work with Opel to develop better links between the German marque and Buick.

Design work
 Ford Motor Company
Ford Fiesta Mk V 
Ford Fusion (Europe) 
 Opel
 Opel Ampera
 Opel GTC Concept
 Opel Cascada
 Opel Insignia Concept
 Opel Insignia A / Mk I
 Opel Insignia B / Mk II
 Opel Karl
 Opel Meriva B
 Opel Monza Concept
 Opel Zafira Tourer Concept
 Cadillac
 Cadillac CTS saloon/sedan

References

External links

General Motors designers
Opel designers
Alumni of the Royal College of Art
Living people
English engineers
1961 births
British automobile designers